Carol Frech (1896 – 1959) was a Romanian football striker.

International career
Carol Frech played in the first official match of Romania's national team at the 1922 King Alexander's Cup, against Yugoslavia. He was also part of Romania's 1924 Summer Olympics squad, but he did not play in any matches.

Scores and results table. Romania's goal tally first:

Honours
Chinezul Timișoara
Divizia A: 1921–22, 1922–23, 1923–24, 1924–25

References

1896 births
1959 deaths
Romanian footballers
Romania international footballers
Footballers at the 1924 Summer Olympics
Place of birth missing
Association football forwards
Chinezul Timișoara players
Liga I players